The following is a list of manga publications published by Houbunsha based on the 2011 anime series, Puella Magi Madoka Magica.

The series revolves around a schoolgirl named Madoka Kaname, as well as her friend Sayaka Miki, who are approached by a creature called, Kyubey, who offers them to become Magical Girls in turn. The new student in their class, Homura Akemi, however, mysteriously seeks to prevent Madoka from making this contract.

Puella Magi Madoka Magica
 is a direct adaptation of the anime series illustrated by Hanokage. The story follows 14-year-old Madoka Kaname, as she discovers the world of magical girls and the dark secrets it holds. The series is published in three tankōbon volumes, released on February 12, 2011, March 12, 2011, and May 30, 2011, respectively. The series was released in North America by Yen Press in 2012.

Puella Magi Madoka Magica: The Different Story
 is another spin-off manga illustrated by Hanokage, which takes place on an alternate timeline to the main series. It was released in three tankōbon volumes between October 12, 2012, and November 12, 2012. Yen Press has licensed the volumes in North America.

Puella Magi Madoka Magica: Homura's Revenge!
, written and illustrated by Golden Pe Done, began serialization in the first issue of Manga Time Kirara Magica released on June 8, 2012.

Puella Magi Madoka Magica the Movie: Rebellion
 is an adaptation of the theatrical film of the same name, once again illustrated by Hanokage. The series was released in three tankobon volumes between November 12, 2013, and January 10, 2014. Yen Press licensed the series to be released as a single hardback volume in June 2015, however, this release was cancelled and the manga was instead released as three paperback tankobon volumes.

Puella Magi Madoka Magica: Wraith Arc
, written and illustrated by Hanokage, began serialization in the 20th issue of Manga Time Kirara Magica released on June 10, 2015. The plot depicts the events that happened between Puella Magi Madoka Magica the Movie: Eternal and Puella Magi Madoka Magica the Movie: Rebellion.

Puella Magi Kazumi Magica: The Innocent Malice
 is a side-story with little connection to the main series, written by Masaki Hiramatsu and illustrated by Takashi Tensugi. It focuses on an amnesiac magical girl named Kazumi who, along with her friends, the Pleiades Saints, learns of the dark secrets as she regains her memory. The series was serialized in Manga Time Kirara Carat between January 24, 2011, and November 24, 2012, with the first tankōbon volume released on May 12, 2011. Yen Press has licensed the series in North America.

Puella Magi Oriko Magica
 is a spin-off from the main series, written by Kuroe Mura. Taking place in an alternate timeline from the anime series, the story follows the magical girls as they investigate a case of magical girl hunting. The series was released in two tankōbon volumes on May 12, 2011, and June 12, 2011, respectively. Yen Press has licensed the two Oriko volumes and Extra Story in North America.

Puella Magi Oriko Magica: Extra Story
Two side-story arcs, titled Noisy Citrine and Symmetry Diamond, focusing on Kirika Kure and Oriko Mikuni respectively, have been published in Houbunsha's Manga Time Kirara Magica magazine. They were then collected in a volume titled  along with a new short story, The Last Agate.

Puella Magi Oriko Magica: Sadness Prayer
A prequel to the first Oriko Magica installment, is also being published in Kirara Magica. The first collected volume was released in Japan on February 12, 2015. Sadness Prayer explores the events that happen prior to Oriko Magica, but after the prologue where Oriko becomes a magical girl. The story is split into two distinct parts: the first exploring Oriko's new friend Komaki Asako, another magical girl; how Oriko met Kirika; Oriko's family; Komaki's friends, and her death by Kirika's hands. The second part features the reappearance of Sasa Yuuki and the introduction of many more magical girls.

Puella Magi Homura Tamura: Parallel Worlds Do Not Remain Parallel Forever
A slice of life four-panel spin-off series, written and illustrated by Afro, is serialized in Manga Time Kirara Magica and released its first volume in October 2013. The manga follows the main characters of the anime in the role of "normal high school girls", and is licensed internationally by Yen Press.

Puella Magi Suzune Magica
 is a spin-off written and illustrated by GAN. The story follows a "magical girl killer" named Suzune Amano who comes face to face with a group of magical girls seeking to know why. The first four chapters were released in the first tankobon volume on November 12, 2013, before the series continued in Manga Time Kirara Forward from November 22, 2013, to November 22, 2014.

Puella Magi Tart Magica: The Legend of Jeanne d'Arc
 is a spin-off manga illustrated by Masugitsune/Kawazu-ku and serialized in Manga Time Kirara Forward. It is set in the 15th century and focuses on Joan of Arc who is revered as a hero of the Hundred Years' War and a saint of the Catholic Church. The first tankōbon volume was published by Houbunsha in June 2014. Yen Press has licensed the volumes in North America.

Magia Record
The Magia Record manga are based on the video game of the same name. The first series consists of short comedic promotional comics posted on the Magia Record website that were later released in physical volumes. The manga, is illustrated by PAPA and explains aspects of the game. Another series, began serialization in Manga Time Kirara Forward in August 2018. It is illustrated by Fujino Fuji. Also published in Manga Time Kirara Forward is an anthology series authored by several different artists. In May 2019, illustrated by U35, began serialization in Comic Fuz. Both the first Side Story series and Another Story are licensed in English by Yen Press.

Magia Report

Side Story

Another Story

Anthology

Other works
In 2011 and 2012, Houbunsha began publishing two anthology series, which featured various authors' interpretations of the Madoka Magica franchise. In June 2012, Houbunsha launched the magazine Manga Time Kirara Magica, dedicated to the Madoka Magica franchise. It published several series which expanded upon the series' universe, or reimagined the characters in different scenarios. In February 2017, the magazine switched from a bimonthly to irregular publication schedule, and all series ended, with the exception of Tomoe Mami no Heibon na Nichijō, which transferred to Manga Time Kirara Forward.

References

External links
 Official manga website 

chapters
Puella Magi Madoka Magica
Seinen manga